Ismailia Air Base is an Egyptian Air Force helicopter base, located approximately 4 km west-northwest of the city of Ismailia; (Al Isma`iliyah); 116 km northeast of Cairo.

History

Ismailia was a pre-World War II station, originally opened by the British about 1916.

On 5–7 November 1938, RAF Vickers Wellesley aircraft set a non-stop distance record by flying from Ismailia to Darwin, Australia, a distance of 7,162 miles (11520.4 km).

During World War II, the airfield, then known as RAF Ismailia or Ismailia Airfield, continued to be used as a military airfield by the British Royal Air Force and also the United States Army Air Force during the North African Campaign against Axis forces.

Today, the airfield is an active Egyptian Air Force base. The base is housing an SA-342 Gazelle unit and further is this base being used for other military helicopter movements.

Major units assigned
 Royal Air Force
 No. 208 Squadron RAF  1920-1922
 No. 113 Squadron RAF  Aug-Sep 1917
 No. 211 Squadron RAF  Jan 1939-Nov 1940
 No. 40 Wing RAF       1919-Apr 1920
 No. 33 Squadron RAF 1938 - ?
 United States Army Air Forces (Ninth Air Force)
 12th Bombardment Group October 1942-Undetermined (B-25 Mitchell)
 436th Troop Carrier Group, 13 August - 18 October 1942. C-47 Skytrain
 434th Bombardment Group, 14 August – 29 September 1942, B-25 Mitchell

 "Gladiator Ace" (2010), B. Cull, Haynes Publishing, p. 20 -21.

See also
 List of World War II North Africa Airfields

References

 Royal Air Force Airfield Creation for the Western Desert Campaign

External links

Airports in Egypt
World War II airfields in Egypt
Airfields of the United States Army Air Forces in Egypt
Airports established in 1916